Over My Dead Body was a straight edge hardcore punk band from San Diego that featured former members from Built To Last, Forced Life, Palpatine, Four Walls Falling and Unbroken. David Kennedy of Box Car Racer, Hazen Street and Angels & Airwaves fame was also in the band for a short period between replacing full-time members, but ultimately left, due to commitments regarding Box Car Racer. Along with Aaron Cooley, and Scott Lopian, Kennedy added to the Built To Last alumni.  They released 3 albums, a split with Death Threat, numerous demo recordings, and were included on 2 compilations.

Discography

Since, vocalist Daniel Sant has gone on to form punk band  Northern Towns.

External links
 Indecision Records band page 

Straight edge groups
Bridge 9 Records artists
Musical groups from San Diego